The 2012 Maryland Terrapins men's soccer team was the college's 67th season of playing organized men's college soccer. The Terrapins played in the Atlantic Coast Conference where they emerged as the regular season and tournament champions.

Background

Review

Competitions

Preseason

Regular season

ACC Standings

Results summary

Results by round

Match reports 

Home team is listed on the right, away team is listed on the left.

ACC Tournament

Bracket

Results 

Number in parentheses indicates ACC Tournament seed. Other numbers indicate their NSCAA/NCAA Ranking.

NCAA Tournament 

Number in parentheses represents the tournament seed. No number in parentheses indicates that the team was not seeded for the tournament. Any other rankings indicate the team's NSCAA/NCAA ranking.

College Cup

See also 
2012 Atlantic Coast Conference men's soccer season
2012 Atlantic Coast Conference Men's Soccer Tournament

References 

Maryland Terrapins
Maryland Terrapins men's soccer seasons
Maryland Terrapins
Maryland Terrapins
2012 Maryland
2012